Syzygium conglomerata is a species of plant from the family of Myrtaceae. It is found in Malaysia and Singapore.

References

conglomeratum
Taxonomy articles created by Polbot
Taxobox binomials not recognized by IUCN